Agononida isabelensis is a species of squat lobster in the family Munididae. The species name is from Isabel, one of the Solomon Islands. It is found off of the Solomon Islands, as the specific epithet implies.

References

Squat lobsters
Crustaceans described in 2009